Crenicichla sedentaria is a species of cichlid native to South America. It is found in the Amazon River basin, in the upper Ucayali River drainage, upper Huallaga River drainage near Tingo María in Peru, and the Napo and Putumayo River drainages in Ecuador.

References

sedentaria
Fish of Ecuador
Freshwater fish of Peru
Fish of the Amazon basin
Taxa named by Sven O. Kullander
Fish described in 1986